Doddaballapur Assembly constituency is one of the 224 constituencies in the Karnataka Legislative Assembly of Karnataka a state of India. It is also part of Chikballapur Lok Sabha constituency and was formerly in Mysore State.

Members of Legislative Assembly
Source

See also
 Bangalore Rural district
 List of constituencies of Karnataka Legislative Assembly

References

Assembly constituencies of Karnataka
Bangalore Rural district